The 1988 Remscheid A-10 crash occurred on December 8, 1988, when an A-10 Thunderbolt II  attack jet of the United States Air Force crashed onto a residential area in the city of Remscheid, West Germany. The aircraft crashed into the upper floor of an apartment complex. In addition to the pilot, five people were killed. Fifty others were injured, many of them seriously.

According to press reports the plane was engaged in a low-altitude flight exercise. It belonged to a unit from Bentwaters Air Base but at the time of the accident was stationed at Nörvenich Air Base, a so-called Forward Operation Location (FOL).

The flight leader, Captain Marke F. Gibson, was leading his flight followed by his wingman, Captain Michael P. Foster. The cause of the accident was attributed to spatial disorientation, after both planes encountered difficult and adverse weather conditions for visual flying. Captain Gibson was able to maneuver his aircraft to safety, but Captain Foster's aircraft crashed into the houses in Stockder Strasse.

Aftermath
When the number of cancer cases in the vicinity of the accident rose disproportionately in the years after, suspicion rose that the jet, contrary to US statements, may have been loaded with ammunition containing depleted uranium. This was denied by the US military. However, 70 tons of top soil from the accident scene was removed and taken away to a depot (which also happens to be standard procedure for cleanup when a large amount of jet fuel is spilled on populated ground, such as in a plane crash). Also, film material taken during the top-soil removal show radiation warning signs. 120 residents and rescue workers reported skin diseases, diagnosed as (toxic) contact dermatitis.

Damages accounted to approximately DM 13 million and were covered 75% by the US Air Force and 25% by the West German Government.

See also 

 1955 Altensteig mid-air collision
 1959 Okinawa F-100 crash
 1960 Munich C-131 crash
 1964 Machida F-8 crash
 1977 Yokohama F-4 crash
 Cavalese cable car disaster (1998)

References

External links
 The New York Times: U.S. Plane Crashes Into German City

Aviation accidents and incidents in 1988
Accidents and incidents involving United States Air Force aircraft
Aviation accidents and incidents in Germany
1988 in West Germany
1980s in North Rhine-Westphalia
December 1988 events in Europe